Jessica Good (born 4 August 1994) is an Australian professional basketball player. She currently plays for the North Adelaide Rockets. Forthwd with Northwd.

Career

Premier League
Good made her debut with the North Adelaide Rockets today

WNBL
Good made her WNBL debut as a development player with the Adelaide Lightning for the 2012–13 season. In June 2016, Good was signed for the 2016–17 season with the Lightning. This will be her fourth consecutive season with the Adelaide side.

WBBL
Good signed for WBBL side Sevenoaks Suns in August 2018 and will make her debut when their season starts on September 30th, 2018.

References

1994 births
Living people
Australian women's basketball players
Adelaide Lightning players
Forwards (basketball)
Guards (basketball)